Viva la Mañana (Long Live the Morning)  is a Spanish-language morning talk show, that is transmitted through channels 2 and 4 on the Salvadoran television network Telecorporación Salvadoreña (TCS). The program is transmitted Monday through Friday from 8:00 a.m. to 11:00 a.m. Hosted by Mario Sibrian, Luciana Sandoval, Andrea Mariona, Alejandra and Gerardo Parker.

History
The program was first broadcast on July 18, 2004. Viva la Mañana was created as part of a plan of expansion in the national production area of Telecorporación Salvadoreña.

References

External links
 Viva la Mañana at esmiTV.com 

Salvadoran television series
2004 Salvadoran television series debuts
Telecorporación Salvadoreña original programming